Girl in Gold Boots is a 1968 crime/drama film about the seedy underworld of go-go dancing, directed by Ted V. Mikels, who also directed The Astro-Zombies. It was Mikels' first movie for his own company, Gemini.

Plot 
Michele is a young woman working with her abusive father at a diner. She quits her waitressing job when she meets a patron, Buz, who initially came in to rob the place at gunpoint instead invites her to Los Angeles where he promises Michele his sister, the famous Joan Nickels, can land her a job as a dancer at a Hollywood nightclub. The two drive off to L.A. and pick up a traveling musician, Critter.  Once in Hollywood, Michele immediately lands a job as a go-go dancer, Critter as a janitor, and Buz as a drug dealer. Michele soon discovers Buz is heavily involved in the underbelly of the club scene and she becomes witness to the club's drug trade and prostitution connections.

Cast 
Jody Daniels as Finley 'Critter' Jones
Leslie McRay as Michele Casey (as Leslie McRae)
Tom Pace as Buz Nichols
Mark Herron as Leo McCabe
Bara Byrnes as Joanie Nichols
William Bagdad as Marty
Victor Izay as Mr. Casey
Harry Lovejoy as Harry Blatz
James Victor as Joey
Rod Wilmoth as Officer
Chris Howard as Chris
Mike Garrison as Station Attendant
Michael Derrick as Car Attendant
Sheila Roberts as Store Clerk
Dennis Childs as Jail Inmate

Release

Home media 
In 2001, Image Entertainment released the Region 1 DVD of Girl in Gold Boots. This version is now out-of-print.  In 2007, a Region 0 DVD of the movie was released by Alpha Video.

Appearance on MST3K 
Girl in Gold Boots was obscure for many years after its release, until it featured as a Season 10 episode of Mystery Science Theater 3000. Apparent skips in the print used in the television program led to some amusing continuity problems, including a scene in a diner in which Buz suddenly appears in his seat next to Michele and Critter as if he teleports in during their conversation.
One DVD release (from MMI Image Entertainment, using a print from Geneni Film Distributing Company), shows the scene without the unintentional "teleport" skip but has its own continuity breaks, suggesting two different prints of the original film were used.

Soundtrack 
Nearly half of the songs in this music-laden movie, including the title song, were written by singer-songwriter and sound engineer Chris Howard, who appears as himself and is backed by a band called "The Third World" in the credits (not to be confused with the reggae band Third World). One scene features bongo player Preston Epps, who had achieved some fame a decade earlier with his 1959 pop hit, "Bongo Rock". In fact, Epps is listed in the opening credits as "that Bongo Rock man."

References

External links
 
 
 
 Original soundtrack on official Bandcamp page

1968 films
1968 crime drama films
American crime drama films
1960s rediscovered films
Rediscovered American films
Films directed by Ted V. Mikels
1960s English-language films
1960s American films